Balloch may refer to:

Places

Scotland

Pronounced /'bɑləx/
 Balloch, West Dunbartonshire, Scotland
 Balloch Castle
 Balloch Country Park
Balloch railway station
Balloch Central railway station
Balloch Pier railway station
 Balloch, Cumbernauld, Scotland
 Kenmore, Scotland, formerly called Balloch

Pronounced /bə'lox/
 Balloch, Highland Scotland, a residential village four miles east of the city of Inverness

United States

Pronounced /'bɑːlək/
 Balloch, New Hampshire

People
 Alexander Balloch Grosart (1827–1899), Scottish clergyman and literary editor
 Howard Balloch (21st century), former Canadian diplomat

See also 
 Baloch (disambiguation)
 Belloch